The Pelzer Manufacturing Company and Mill Village Historic District is a historic manufacturing complex and associated mill village in Pelzer, South Carolina.  The district includes five mill buildings constructed beginning in 1881 by the Pelzer Manufacturing Company, and a mill village with worker housing and other civic and institutional buildings.  The mill housing was sold off to individuals in 1954.

The district was listed on the National Register of Historic Places in 2017.

See also
National Register of Historic Places listings in Anderson County, South Carolina

References

Historic districts on the National Register of Historic Places in South Carolina
Buildings and structures in Anderson County, South Carolina
National Register of Historic Places in Anderson County, South Carolina